Kolonos Hill is a hill in Central Greece. It is located in the narrow coastal passage known as Thermopylae, and is near the city of Lamia.

History

The hill is best known as the site of the final stand of the 300 Spartans during the Battle of Thermopylae in 480 BC. In 1939, Spyridon Marinatos, a Greek archaeologist found large numbers of Persian arrows around the hill, which changed the hitherto accepted identification of the site where the Greeks had fallen, slain by Persian arrows.

A commemorative stone was placed on the site in antiquity, but the original stone has not survived. In 1955, a new stone was erected, with Simonides's epigram engraved on it.

References

Landforms of Phthiotis
Hills of Greece
Battle of Thermopylae
Landforms of Central Greece